William McKinley "Red" Garland Jr. (May 13, 1923 – April 23, 1984) was an American modern jazz pianist. Known for his work as a bandleader and during the 1950s with Miles Davis, Garland helped popularize the block chord style of playing in jazz piano.

Early life
William "Red" Garland was born in 1923 in Dallas, Texas. He began his musical studies on the clarinet and alto saxophone but, in 1941, switched to the piano. Less than five years later, Garland joined the trumpet player Hot Lips Page, well-known in the southwest, playing with him until a tour ended in New York in March 1946. With Garland having decided to stay in New York to find work, Art Blakey came across Garland playing at a small club, only to return the next night with his boss, Billy Eckstine.

Later life and career

1955–1958: the first great Miles Davis Quintet
Garland became famous in 1954 when he joined the Miles Davis Quintet, featuring John Coltrane, Philly Joe Jones, and Paul Chambers. Davis was a fan of boxing and was impressed that Garland had boxed earlier in his life. Together, the group recorded their famous Prestige albums, Miles: The New Miles Davis Quintet (1954), Workin, Steamin', Cookin', and Relaxin'. Garland's style is prominent in these seminal recordings—evident in his distinctive chord voicings, his sophisticated accompaniment, and his musical references to Ahmad Jamal's style. Some observers dismissed Garland as a "cocktail" pianist, but Miles was pleased with his style, having urged Garland to absorb some of Jamal's lightness of touch and harmonics within his own approach.

Garland played on the first of Davis's many Columbia recordings, 'Round About Midnight (1957). Though he would continue playing with Miles, their relationship was beginning to deteriorate. By 1958, Garland and Jones had started to become more erratic in turning up for recordings and shows. He was eventually fired by Miles, but later returned to play on another jazz classic, Milestones. Davis was displeased when Garland quoted Davis's much earlier, and by then famous, solo from "Now's The Time" in block chords during the slower take of "Straight, No Chaser". Garland walked out of one of the sessions for Milestones, so that on the track "Sid's Ahead", Davis comped behind the saxophone solos.

1958–1984: Red Garland Trio and later life
In 1958, Garland formed his own trio. Among the musicians the trio recorded with are Pepper Adams, Nat Adderley, Ray Barretto, Kenny Burrell, Eddie "Lockjaw" Davis, Jimmy Heath, Harold Land, Philly Joe Jones, Blue Mitchell, Ira Sullivan, and Leroy Vinnegar. The trio also recorded as a quintet with John Coltrane and Donald Byrd.
Altogether, Garland led 19 recording sessions while at Prestige Records and 25 sessions for Fantasy Records. He stopped playing professionally for a number of years in the 1960s when the popularity of rock music coincided with a substantial drop in the popularity of jazz.

Garland eventually returned to his native Texas in the 1970s to care for his aged mother. He led a recording in 1977, named Crossings, which reunited him with Philly Joe Jones, and he teamed up with bassist Ron Carter. His later work tended to sound more modern and less polished than his better known recordings. He continued recording until his death from a heart attack on April 23, 1984, at the age of 60.

Partial discography

As leader

Compilations

 Rediscovered Masters (Prestige, 1958–61 [1977])
 At the Prelude, Vol. 1 (Prestige, 1959 [1994]) (compilation of Red Garland at the Prelude + Red Garland Live!)
 Blues in the Night (Prestige, 1960 [1997]) (compilation of Halleloo-Y'-All + Soul Burnin' )
 Red's Blues (Prestige, 1956–62 [1998])
 Stretching Out (Prestige, 1959 [2002]) (compilation of Satin Doll + Lil' Darlin' )
 The Best of the Red Garland Quintets (Prestige, 2004)
 The Best of the Red Garland Trios (Prestige, 2004)

As sideman
With Arnett Cobb
Sizzlin' (Prestige, 1960)
Ballads by Cobb (Moodsville, 1960)

With John Coltrane
Tenor Conclave (Prestige, 1957) with Al Cohn, Hank Mobley, Zoot Sims
John Coltrane with the Red Garland Trio (Prestige, 1957; reissued as Traneing In)
Soultrane (Prestige, 1958)
Lush Life (Prestige, 1961)
Settin' The Pace (Prestige, 1961)
Standard Coltrane (Prestige, 1962)
The Believer (Prestige, 1964)
The Last Trane (Prestige, 1965)

With Miles Davis
 The Musings of Miles  (Prestige, 1955)
 Miles: The New Miles Davis Quintet  (Prestige, 1955)
 Cookin' with The Miles Davis Quintet  (Prestige, 1956)
 Relaxin' with The Miles Davis Quintet (Prestige, 1956)
 Workin' with The Miles Davis Quintet (Prestige, 1956)
 Steamin' with The Miles Davis Quintet (Prestige, 1956)
 'Round About Midnight (Columbia, 1957)
 Milestones  (Columbia, 1958)

With Curtis Fuller 
Curtis Fuller with Red Garland (Prestige, 1957)

With Jackie McLean
McLean's Scene (Prestige, 1956)

With Charlie Parker
Charlie Parker at Storyville (Blue Note, 1953)

With Art Pepper
Art Pepper Meets the Rhythm Section (Contemporary, 1957)

With Sonny Rollins
Tenor Madness (Prestige, 1956)

With Phil Woods
Sugan (Status/Prestige, 1957 [1965])

References

External links 
"Red's Bells," an in-depth analysis by Ethan Iverson
Discography at jazzdisco.org

1923 births
1984 deaths
American jazz pianists
American male pianists
Musicians from Dallas
Hard bop pianists
Miles Davis Quintet members
Xanadu Records artists
Muse Records artists
Prestige Records artists
Timeless Records artists
Galaxy Records artists
20th-century American pianists
American male jazz musicians
African-American pianists
20th-century American male musicians